Dunkettle railway station was a railway station to the east of Cork City in Ireland. Originally part of the Cork and Youghal Railway, it opened on 10 November 1859 and was closed in 1966. 

In the early 21st century, it was proposed to reopen a station at Dunkettle on the Cobh line of the Cork Suburban Rail project. These plans were refused planning permission in 2009.

See also
 Dunkettle Interchange (a major road junction immediately to the east of the former station site)

References

Disused railway stations in County Cork
Railway stations opened in 1859
Railway stations closed in 1966